Daniel Farrar (born November 8, 1985) is an American soccer coach.

Career
Born in Los Angeles, California to a Uruguayan father and a Bolivian mother, Farrar was raised in Paraguay, where he never played professionally. After switching to a managerial role, he returned to the US and worked at FC Barcelona's school in Fort Lauderdale, Florida.

Back to Paraguay, Farrar managed Olimpia and Sportivo Luqueño's youth sides before being named manager of Primera División side River Plate Asunción on 8 August 2016. He left the club on 31 October to take over fellow league team Sol de América.

On 6 March 2017, Farrar was named in charge of División Intermedia side Sportivo Trinidense. He moved to fellow second division team Deportivo Liberación in the following month, and returned to River Plate in 2018, with the club now also in the second level.

Farrar led River Plate to the 2018 Intermedia title, ensuring a return to the top tier, but resigned on 2 October 2019. He was presented at 12 de Octubre late in the month, and achieved another promotion to the first division.

Farrar was sacked by 12 de Octubre on 21 February 2020. The following 10 January, he moved abroad after being named in charge of Venezuelan Primera División side Yaracuyanos, but resigned on 16 May.

On 11 January 2022, Farrar switched teams and countries again after taking over Bolivian side Real Santa Cruz. He was sacked on 12 March, after only six matches.

References

External links

1985 births
Living people
Sportspeople from Los Angeles
American soccer coaches
Citizens of Paraguay through descent
Paraguayan football managers
Club Sol de América managers
Yaracuyanos F.C. managers
Real Santa Cruz managers
Venezuelan Primera División managers
Bolivian Primera División managers
Paraguayan expatriate football managers
Paraguayan expatriate sportspeople in Venezuela
Paraguayan expatriate sportspeople in Bolivia
Expatriate football managers in Venezuela
Expatriate football managers in Bolivia
Paraguayan people of Uruguayan descent
Paraguayan people of Bolivian descent
Sportspeople of Uruguayan descent
American people of Paraguayan descent
American people of Bolivian descent
American sportspeople of Paraguayan descent
Sportspeople of Paraguayan descent
American people of Uruguayan descent
12 de Octubre Football Club managers
Sportivo Trinidense managers
Deportivo Santaní managers
Independiente F.B.C. managers